Q84 may refer to:
 Q84 (New York City bus)
 Al-Inshiqaq, a surah of the Quran
 
 William Robert Johnston Municipal Airport, in Fresno County, California, United States